Okan Avcı (born 29 November 1984 in Muğla, Turkey) is a Turkish film director and actor.

Biography 
Okan Avcı studied motion pictures and acting in Pera Fine Arts and in the meantime sub-aqua technology in Istanbul University. He worked for a short period of time as industrial diver and snail hunter. Afterwards, he started working both behind and the front scenes. He had roles in Annem, Nefes and Çoğunluk, television series broadcast in Turkey. The first of which he shot was his grandmother's life, Kadim and he won the Golden Orange Award. Later on, he made his second documentary Telvin with Erkan Oğur, the Turkish musician made the soundtracts of Kadim. Telvin Tour Documentary has been sold out in DVD format with Kalan Müzik brand. In 2011 summer, he shot another documentary Kaş-Kekova The Protected Areas Project for WWF Turkey. In October, 2012 he had a role in movie The Two Faces of January with Viggo Mortensen, Kirsten Dunst and Oscar İsaac which was directed in Turkey. Now he is progressing in his career in movie making and actor with the movies Akabende Sivas and İçimdeki Balık.

Filmography 

The movies he directed 
Telvin (2012)
5th Documentarist Documentary Days, (2012)
19th Adana Golden Boll Film Festival World Documentaries Anthology, (2012) 
45th Screen Writers Association Awards Best Documentary Nominee (2013)
24th Münich Turkish Films Days (2013)
Kadim (2011)
48th Antalya  Golden Orange Film Festivali, National Best First Documentary Film Award. (2011)
TRT Documentary Film Festival,National Amateur Category, Best Film Award. 2011
8th Akbank  Short Film Festival, Documentary Mension Award. 2012
4th Documentarist Documentary Days New Talents Mention Award 2011
30th İKSV İstanbul International Film Festival, Demonstration. 2011
6th Datça Sinema and Culture Festival, Golden Almond Documentary Film Contest, Contest Movie. 2011
2nd Human Rights Documentary Film Days of Human Rights Foundation of Turkey, Demonstration. 2011
1st Ayvalık Film Festival, International Film Section, Finalist. 2012

Movies he had role:

Lut's Wife (2009)                             
Nefes (2010)                                 
Çoğunluk (2011)  
The Two Faces of January (2012)  
Sivas (2013) 
İçimdeki Balık (2013)

References
Okan Avcı IMDb profile

External links

1984 births
Living people
Istanbul University alumni